Titan is a video game similar to Arkanoid or Breakout published by Titus France in 1988. It was converted to the PC Engine in 1991 by Naxat Soft.

Gameplay
Titan takes the Breakout concept and adds another dimension by allowing the object the player controls to be able to move on the Y-axis in addition to the old X-axis. The display will follow the small square which the player controls as it moves on a map where there are objects whom your goal is to make a ball hit. The player controls a small rectangle only slightly larger than the size of the ball itself and in addition to hitting the "bricks" to destroy them has to keep the ball away from dangerous hazards which will kill the ball if it hits.

Reception

External links

1988 video games
Amiga games
Amstrad CPC games
Atari ST games
Breakout clones
Commodore 64 games
DOS games
FM Towns games
Titus Software games
TurboGrafx-16 games
Video games developed in France
ZX Spectrum games